The Women's 200m backstroke event at the 2010 South American Games was held on March 27, with the heats at 10:35 and the Final at 18:10.

Medalists

Records

Results

Heats

Final

References
Heats
Final

Backstroke 200m W